The Egyptian Expeditionary Force (EEF) was a British Empire military formation, formed on 10 March 1916 under the command of General Archibald Murray from the Mediterranean Expeditionary Force and the Force in Egypt (1914–15), at the beginning of the Sinai and Palestine Campaign of the First World War.

History

Formed in the British protectorate of the Sultanate of Egypt, the initially small force was raised to guard the Suez Canal and Egypt. After the withdrawal from the Gallipoli Campaign the force grew into a large reserve to provide reinforcements for the Western Front, while the Western Frontier Force fought in the Senussi Campaign from 1915 to 1917 and the Eastern Force (EF) defended the canal at the Battle of Romani in August 1916. Following the victory at Romani, part of the Eastern Force pursued the Ottoman invading force back to Palestine after the victories at the Battle of Magdhaba in December 1916 and the Battle of Rafa in January 1917, by which time the Desert Column had been formed within the EF. These victories resulted in the recapture of substantial Egyptian territory and were followed in March and April by two Eastern Force defeats on Ottoman territory, at the First Battle of Gaza and Second Battle of Gaza in southern Palestine.

During the Stalemate in Southern Palestine from April to October 1917, Murray consolidated the EF's position and in June General Edmund Allenby took command and began preparations to take the offensive, employing manoeuvre warfare. He reorganised the force into the XX Corps, XXI Corps and Desert Mounted Corps (formerly the Desert Column). On 31 October two corps captured Beersheba defended by the Ottoman III Corps (which had fought at Gallipoli), which weakened their defences stretching almost continually from Gaza to Beersheba. Subsequently the Battle of Tel el Khuweilfe, the Third Battle of Gaza and the Battle of Hareira and Sheria forced an Ottoman withdrawal from Gaza on the night of 6/7 November and the beginning of the pursuit to Jerusalem.

Serious losses on the Western Front in March 1918 during the German spring offensive, forced the British to divert forces from the EEF. During this time, two unsuccessful attacks were made, the First Transjordan attack on Amman and the Second Transjordan attack on Shunet Nimrin and Es Salt to capture Es Salt, in March and April 1918, before Allenby's force resumed the offensive, again employing manoeuvre warfare at the Battle of Megiddo. The successful infantry attacks of the Battle of Tulkarm and the Battle of Tabsor created gaps in the Ottoman defences, enabling the pursuit by the Desert Mounted Corps to encircle the Ottoman infantry fighting in the Judean Hills during the Battle of Nazareth, the Capture of Afulah and Beisan, the Capture of Jenin, the Battle of Samakh and the capture of Tiberias. The EEF destroyed three Ottoman armies during the Battle of Sharon, the Battle of Nablus and the Third Transjordan attack, capturing thousands of prisoners and large quantities of equipment. The EEF pursued the surviving German and Ottoman forces to Damascus and Aleppo, before the Ottoman Empire agreed to the Armistice of Mudros on 30 October 1918, ending the Sinai and Palestine Campaign. The British Mandate of Palestine, and the Mandate for Syria and the Lebanon were created to administer the captured territories.

Structure

Weapons 

 QF 13-pounder gun
 QF 18-pounder gun

See also
 Sinai and Palestine Campaign
 History of Palestine
 Postage stamps and postal history of Palestine

References

Bibliography

Further reading
 
 
 
 
 
 
 
 
 
 
 
 
 
 
 

Expeditionary units and formations
Commands of the British Army
Egypt
Egypt
Military units and formations of the British Army in World War I
Egypt in World War I
Middle Eastern theatre of World War I
World War I orders of battle
Military units and formations established in 1916
Military units and formations disestablished in 1919